Start (スタート) is the debut studio album from Japanese girl group Mameshiba no Taigun. It was pre-released on June 3, 2020, and officially released on June 10, 2020 by Tower Records. The album has thirteen tracks, including the singles "Restart", "Rocket Start" and "Daijōbu Sunrise", and the digital singles "Flash" and "Donkusa Happy".

Release
Start was initially scheduled for release on May 13, 2020, however it was delayed to June 10 due to the COVID-19 pandemic. The album was pre-released on June 3.

Track listing

Charts

References

2020 debut albums
Japanese-language albums